Westbury was a parliamentary constituency in Wiltshire from 1449 to 2010. It was represented in the House of Commons of England until 1707, and then in the House of Commons of Great Britain from 1707 to 1800, and finally in the House of Commons of the Parliament of the United Kingdom from 1801 until 2010.

Until 1885, it was a parliamentary borough, returning two Members of Parliament (MPs) until 1832 and only one from 1832 to 1885. The parliamentary borough was abolished in 1885, when the name was transferred to a county constituency returning one MP.  Elections used the bloc vote system when two MPs were returned, and the first-past-the-post system of election when one seat was contested.

Westbury returned a Conservative Member at every election after 1924.

Boundaries

1885–1918: The Sessional Divisions of Bradford-on-Avon, Melksham, Trowbridge, Westbury, and Whorwellsdon, and part of the Sessional Division of Warminster.

1918–1950: The Urban Districts of Bradford-on-Avon, Melksham, Trowbridge, Warminster, and Westbury, and the Rural Districts of Bradford-on-Avon, Melksham, Mere, Warminster, and Westbury and Whorwellsdown.

1950–1974: The Urban Districts of Bradford-on-Avon, Melksham, Trowbridge, Warminster, and Westbury, and the Rural Districts of Bradford-on-Avon and Melksham, Mere and Tisbury, and Warminster and Westbury.

1974–1983: As prior but with redrawn boundaries.

1983–1997: The District of West Wiltshire, and the District of Salisbury wards of Knoyle, Mere, and Western.

1997–2010: The District of West Wiltshire wards of Adcroft, Bradford-on-Avon North, Bradford-on-Avon South, college, Corsley, Dilton Marsh, Drynham, Ethandune, Holt, John O'Gaunt, Manor Vale, Mid Wylye Valley, Park, Paxcroft, Shearwater, Summerham, Warminster East, Warminster West, Weavers, Westbrook, Westbury with Storridge, and Wylye Valley, and the District of Salisbury wards of Knoyle, Mere, and Western.

Originally a small pocket borough, covering only a small part of the parish of Westbury, in 1885 the parliamentary borough became a county constituency in Wiltshire. At the time of the constituency's abolition in 2010 it included the towns of Westbury, Warminster, Trowbridge, and Bradford-on-Avon, and the surrounding rural areas as far south as Mere. Until boundary changes in 1997, it also included Melksham.

Boundary review, 2005
Following a review of parliamentary representation in Wiltshire, the Boundary Commission for England created two new constituencies in the county. Chippenham was created mostly from the adjoining North Wiltshire constituency, plus the town of Bradford-on-Avon at the northern end of the Westbury constituency, while the rest of Westbury saw minor changes to its composition and was renamed South West Wiltshire. These changes were approved in 2005, to take effect at the following general election, which ultimately took place in 2010.

Members of Parliament

Westbury borough (before 1885)

MPs 1449–1640

MPs 1640–1832

MPs 1832–1885

Westbury County constituency (1885–2010)

Elections

Elections in the 1830s

Hanmer resigned, causing a by-election.

Elections in the 1840s

Elections in the 1850s

Elections in the 1860s

The 1868 election was declared void on petition, due to intimidation of the electorate, causing a by-election.

Elections in the 1870s

Elections in the 1880s

Elections in the 1890s

Elections in the 1900s

Elections in the 1910s 

General Election 1914–15

Another General Election was required to take place before the end of 1915. The political parties had been making preparations for an election to take place and by the July 1914, the following candidates had been selected; 
Liberal Party: Geoffrey Howard
Unionist Party:George Palmer

Elections in the 1920s

Elections in the 1930s 

General Election 1939–40

Another General Election was required to take place before the end of 1940. The political parties had been making preparations for an election to take place and by the Autumn of 1939, the following candidates had been selected; 
Conservative: Robert Grimston 
Liberal: Harcourt Johnstone
Labour: George Ward

Elections in the 1940s

Elections in the 1950s

Elections in the 1960s

Elections in the 1970s

Elections 1983–2005

Notes and references
Craig, F. W. S. (1983). British parliamentary election results 1918-1949 (3 ed.). Chichester: Parliamentary Research Services. .

Sources 
Guardian Unlimited (2004). Ask Aristotle - Westbury. Retrieved 16 November 2004.
D Brunton & D H Pennington, Members of the Long Parliament (London: George Allen & Unwin, 1954)
"Cobbett's Parliamentary history of England, from the Norman Conquest in 1066 to the year 1803" (London: Thomas Hansard, 1808) 

Parliamentary constituencies in Wiltshire (historic)
1449 establishments in England
Constituencies of the Parliament of the United Kingdom disestablished in 2010
Westbury, Wiltshire